was a town located in Minamitakaki District, Nagasaki Prefecture, Japan.
As of 2003, the town had an estimated population of 7,870 and a density of 322.81 persons per km². The total area was 24.38 km².

On March 31, 2006, Kazusa, along with the towns of Arie, Fukae, Futsu, Kitaarima, Kuchinotsu, Minamiarima and Nishiarie (all from Minamitakaki District), was merged to create the city of Minamishimabara.

A population of resident dolphins around Tsuuji shima provides opportunities for dolphin watching and this largely contributes local tourism.

External links
 Minamishimabara official website 

Dissolved municipalities of Nagasaki Prefecture